The Block is an Australian reality television series broadcast on the Nine Network. The series follows four or five couples as they compete against each other to renovate and style houses/apartments and sell them at auction for the highest price.

The original series first ran for two consecutive seasons in 2003 and 2004, and was originally hosted by Jamie Durie.

The Nine Network revived The Block after a six-year absence, with a third season commenced airing on 22 September 2010, this time hosted by television personality and builder Scott Cam. Shelley Craft joined as co-host from the fourth season.

The Block has a large number of commercial sponsors and prominently features brand sponsorships regularly throughout episodes.

Format
The original format of the series featured four couples with a prior relationship renovating a derelict apartment block in the Sydney suburb of Bondi, with each couple renovating a separate apartment over a period of 12 weeks and with a budget of A$40,000. The apartments were then sold at auction, with each couple keeping any profit made above a set reserve price and the couple with the highest profit winning a A$100,000 prize. The current format is relatively the same except the series usually features five couples, it is mainly based in Melbourne suburbs and the budget is $100,000+.

The first season was filmed at Bondi and the second at Manly. The third season again took place in Sydney, in the suburb of Vaucluse. Moving to Victoria, Australia, the fourth season was filmed in the Melbourne suburb of Richmond, Victoria on Cameron Street. Breaking with tradition, season four was filmed in four side-by-side houses as opposed to an apartment block of four. Season four saw television personality Shelley Craft join Scott Cam in hosting the show.

Season five began airing in April 2012. As with season four, season five has retained the four separate houses format, as opposed to four apartments in a single apartment block as in earlier seasons. Season five is again set in Melbourne, on Dorcas Street, and is set in four adjacent multi-storey town houses. Season six returned to Sydney, in Bondi, for the tenth anniversary. The program has remained in Melbourne since season seven.

The first three seasons of The Block aired once weekly for 13, 26 and 9 weeks respectively. Since season four, the program has aired across multiple nights per week.

Hosts and judges

Series overview

Combined profits

Auction

Notes

Returning teams

 Brad & Dale were both contestants on Season 5, but they were with their partners (Lara & Sophie respectively). In Season 8, they returned to the show as a team.
 This amount of money is split between the two contestants in the team.

Season synopsis

Season 1

The first season of The Block began airing on 1 June 2003 on the Nine Network, replacing Backyard Blitz and Location Location in the network's flagship time slot of Sunday at 6:30 to 7:30 pm (AEST). The season was presented by Backyard Blitz host Jamie Durie and filmed in Bondi, New South Wales, with the majority of filming being completed prior to the series airing for editing purposes.

Selected from approximately 2,000 applicants, the four couples in the season were:
 Adam Thorn (aged 30) and Fiona Mills (27), a married couple from Banksia. A data analyst and former sales representative, the couple had renovated three properties prior to competing on The Block. They renovated the first ground-floor apartment (flat number one) and were widely considered the "show favourites" throughout the course of the season. Their apartment—which was the last to be auctioned—sold for $751,000 earning them the highest profit of $156,000 as well as the winning prize of $100,000. Mills appeared on the cover of Ralph while the season was airing in July 2003.
 Warren Sonin (37) and Gavin Atkins (35), a sales manager and public relations manager from Elizabeth Bay, New South Wales. They are the first male same-sex couple to compete on The Block.
 Paul and Kylie Ingram
 Phil Rankine and Amity Dry

The auction profits had a combined result of $.

Season 2

Following the success of the first season, an expanded second season of 26 episodes, airing twice weekly, premiered on 18 April 2004. The season was again set in Sydney, although in the suburb of Manly rather than Bondi where the first season was located.

The auction profits had a combined result of $ with two properties not selling at auction.

Selected from over 18,000 applicants, the four couples in the season were:

Two original contestants, Dani and Monique Bacha, left the program in January 2004, two weeks into the second season, when it was reported that Dani had spent six months in jail in 2002 following his conviction for a drug-related offence. Andrew Rochford and Jamie Nicholson replaced Dani and Monique Bacha.

Season 3

After a long break, the series was revived in 2010 with a set of four apartments in the upmarket suburb of Vaucluse in Sydney being renovated and Scott Cam replacing Jamie Durie as host.

The auction profits had a combined result of $ with only one property not selling at auction.

Season 4

Season four saw six major changes to the format of The Block.
 The location has changed to Melbourne instead of Sydney.
 An initial elimination week sees eight couples reduced to four.
 Instead of a block of flats with four apartments, there are four separate houses next to one another.
 Contestants now have to renovate the exterior of their home, in addition to the interior.
 Instead of two one-hour-long episodes airing per week, six episodes now air per week with a mix of one-hour- and half-hour-length episodes.
 Shelley Craft has been introduced to help host special challenges where contestants can win extra cash and prizes for their houses.
 A weekly episode named "The Blocked: Unlocked" was introduced. Hosted by Shelley Craft, the episode shares a personal insight into The Block transformations as the couples guide viewers through their completed rooms. It also includes behind the scenes footage and footage not seen on the main show.

Eight couples were initially selected, with four being eliminated and the other four being given keys to the houses. The four remaining teams are:
 Josh and Jenna – House 1 (Blue)
 Polly and Waz – House 2 (Yellow)
 Katrina and Amie – House 3 (Green)
 Rod and Tanya – House 4 (Red)

The winners of The Block were Polly and Waz. They made $15,000 in profit, and won the $100,000 grand prize, due to the other three couples' houses being passed in. In this finale episode, Josh proposed to Jenna, his girlfriend for five years and partner on The Block.

This was the worst auction in the history of The Block with auction profits having a combined result of $ due to only one property selling at auction.

Polly and Waz were the only couple whose property sold at auction, with the other three failing to meet their reserve prices. Following the auction, Amie and Katrina's property sold for their exact reserve amount, meaning they would not take any winnings from appearing on The Block.  Also, Rod and Tania's property sold for the highest profit on The Block, at $72,000 (however, as it was after the auction, Polly and Waz are still the winners).

Season 5

This season, like season four, was also based in Melbourne, in the inner city suburb of South Melbourne with four double storey side by side terrace houses located at 401 – 407 Dorcas Street. The properties are all on separate titles with car access from Montague Street and plans approved to allow for a third story extension.

Eight couples were initially selected, with four being eliminated and the other four being given keys to the houses. The four remaining teams are:
 Dale and Sophie – House 1 (Blue)
 Mike and Andrew – House 2 (Yellow)
 Brad and Lara – House 3 (Green)
 Dan and Dani – House 4 (Red)

The auction profits had a combined result of $

Season 6

It was announced during the finale of the fifth season that an all-star edition of the series would air in 2013, with viewers able to vote for couples to return from past seasons. These votes were taken into consideration when selecting the contestants, and the four returning couples were announced in October 2012 as Phil and Amity (of season one), Mark and Duncan (season three), Josh and Jenna (season four) and Dan and Dani (season five). Phil and Amity won All Stars with a total of $1,670,000 selling for their home. The auction profits had a combined result of $.

Production for the series relocated from Melbourne—which had hosted the prior two seasons—to its original location of Bondi in Sydney to celebrate the tenth anniversary of the show's first season. Filming took place over nine weeks from October to December 2012.

Darren Palmer, who was a guest judge in the fourth and fifth seasons, replaced John McGrath as a permanent judge for this season. Both Neale Whitaker and Shaynna Blaze reprised their roles as judges from the previous season.

Season 7

The Nine Network renewed The Block for a seventh season to air after Easter in 2013. The location for this season was 142 Park Street, South Melbourne. The building consists of 5 levels, with each couple allocated a full level to renovate. Alisa and Lysandra renovated level 1, Matt and Kim were responsible for level 2, level 3 was occupied by Bec and George, level 4 was completed by Madi and Jarrod and level 5 was made over by Trixie and Johnno.

Twin sisters Alisa and Lysandra won The Block, with a profit of $295,000. The auction profits had a combined result of $.

• Alisa & Lysandra win The Block with a $4000 profit lead over Madi & Jarrod.

Season 8

Applications for the eighth season of the series opened whilst the seventh season was airing, with couples aged between 18 and 65 years old being sought by casting agents. Filming for the season was scheduled to occur between November 2013 and January 2014, and aired from 27 January 2014.

Season 8 was based in the Melbourne suburb of Albert Park, Victoria. The production company paid $5.9 million for 47 O’Grady Street, a brick warehouse that was then transformed into four luxury apartments.

The working title of season 8 was "Fans vs Favourites" as shown in the 2014 preview that was aired on the Big Brother 2013 finale. Returning to The Block were Brad and Dale (season 5) / Alisa and Lysandra (season 7). Joining The Block were The Super K's – Kyal and Kara, and The Retro Rookies – Steve and Chantelle. Steve O'Donnell and Chantelle Ford won The Block with a profit of $636,000 + $100,000 winners' prize money. The auction profits had a combined result of $.

In May 2014, Lukas Kamay – who had won the auction for Alisa and Lysandra's apartment – was arrested for his involvement in an insider trading scam, for which he was later convicted and jailed. Commonwealth Director of Public Prosecutions Robert Bromwich told the court that the apartment purchase gave Kamay's crimes "a cloak of respectability". The sale agreement was broken, with the apartment to be re-sold at a later date.

Season 9

The ninth season of The Block featured contestants renovating a former office building in Prahran into luxury apartments, with the season subtitled as The Block: Glasshouse. Filming began in April 2014. One of the contestants was former professional Australian rules footballer Darren Jolly and his wife Deanne as one of the couples. The season debuted on 27 July 2014 at the 6:30 time slot.

Shannon and Simon Voss won The Block with a profit of $335,000 + $100,000 winners' prize money, while Michael & Carlene and Darren & Deanne made the bare minimum of $10,000 above reserve. Even newly-weds Karstan & Maxine only netted $40,000 in winnings. The auction profits had combined results of $.

Season 10

The Block was renewed for a Tenth season which was to begin airing on 27 January 2015.

The working title of season 10 was "Triple Threat" as shown in the 2014 preview that was aired on 23 November 2014.  It was premiered on 27 January 2015 where contestants renovate a former three-level block of flats.  Darren & Deanne (season 9), Bec & George and Matt & Kim (both season 7) returned to vie for a spot as contestants. Former contestant Dan Reilly from seasons 5 and 6 returned, this time as an apprentice foreman ("foreboy") under Keith's guidance after Dan himself became a qualified builder, who was a qualified carpenter during his stints as a contestant.

Former contestants Darren & Deanne won the season with $835,000 + $100,000 prize money, and all contestants won over $665,000. The auction profits had a combined result of $.

Season 11

The Block was renewed for an eleventh season, which went into production in May 2015. Season 11 put the show 'back-to-basics' after ratings declines during the tenth season; episodes were cut from 90 to 60 minutes, fewer episodes, the eliminations were removed and Thursday night episodes were dropped.

Filming for season 11 began on 15 May 2015.  This season renovated the former Hotel Saville in South Yarra – an octagonal, eight floor brick building.  The title for Season 11 is "The Block: Blocktagon".

Co-creator Julian Cress said that this season of The Block would have no tradies and only passionate do-it-yourself couples. In other seasons, at least one person in each team had a trade. The change came in the new direction in the back-to-basics change to the season. Cress said viewers would relate more to the characters who are big on spirit but small on skills when the show returned later in the year.

This season was sponsored by Mitre 10 (building equipment), Swisse Australia (vitamins), Aldi (groceries), Domain (money and apartment information), The Good Guys (electronics and kitchens) and Suzuki (transport).

Shay & Dean Paine won the season with $655,000 + $100,000 prize money, and all contestants won over $349,000. The auction profits had a combined result of $.

Season 12

On 28 October 2015, Nine renewed the series for a twelfth season. Since 2013, the Nine Network had aired two seasons of the show each year. In 2016, however, this would be the one and only season airing, and it did not air until the last quarter of 2016. It was once again set in Melbourne. On 27 December 2015, Frank Valentic teased a video saying that there are rumours of The Block going to Greville Street, Prahran.

On 18 February 2016, it was reported that The Blocks producers had bought an old heritage-listed soap factory for $5 million at 164 Ingles Street, Port Melbourne. This address was confirmed by Scott Cam on The Today Show on 9 May 2016. Filming began on 26 May 2016. The series began airing in August 2016 and had 5 teams competing. The season premiered on Sunday 21 August 2016. This season's contestants, Julia & Sasha, are the first ever female same-sex couple to compete on any season of The Block. The season concluded on 13 November 2016.

This season is sponsored by Mitre 10 (building equipment), Aldi (groceries), Domain (cash flow and apartment information), McCafé (snacks, beverages, and the McCafe Quality Award), Stayz (challenge and additional finale prizes), Suzuki (transport and viewer voting prize) and Telstra (Smart Home Technology and additional cash flow).

William Bethune & Karlie Cicero won the season with $715,000 + $100,000 prize money. Each team of contestants won $425,000 or more. The auction profits had a combined result of $.

Season 13

On 8 November 2016, The Block was renewed for a thirteenth season at Nine's upfronts.  Applications for the thirteenth season of the series opened on 9 January 2017, with energetic couples aged between 18 and 65 years old being sought by casting agents. Filming for the season is scheduled to occur between April 2017 and July 2017. The casting call also specifies first round couples will be reduced to final participants in the first week of filming, which suggests Season 13 will feature an elimination round similar to that of Season 5.

On 11 March 2017, it was reported that a vacant block of land at 46 Regent Street, Elsternwick, had been purchased for $9.6 million back in December 2016, with plans approved to build a five lot subdivision, meaning for the first time ever, they would be building a property from the ground up, instead of renovating an existing building. On 17 March 2017, it was officially confirmed that 46 Regent Street Elsternwick will be the location of The Blocks thirteenth season with filming to begin on 27 April 2017, however they will not be building a property from the ground up, as five old rundown weatherboard houses are being relocated to the location, meaning this will be the first time since the sixth season the contestants will renovate a house.

In June 2017, Network Nine officially announced  the location and teams for the thirteenth season of The Block, one team being Aussie Model Elyse Knowles and her Boyfriend Josh. The season will premiere on Sunday 30 July 2017.

This season is sponsored by Mitre 10 (building equipment), Domain (cash flow & house marketing), McCafé (snacks & beverages), Stayz (challenge & additional finale prizes), Volkswagen (transport & cash flow), Centrum (vitamins) & Youfoodz (groceries & meals).

Elyse Knowles & Josh Barker won the season with $447,000 + $100,000 prize money. Each team of contestants won $95,000 or more. The auction profits had a combined result of $.

Season 14

On 21 November 2016, it was reported the producers were looking at The Gatwick Private Hotel at 34 Fitzroy Street, St Kilda as a possible site for its thirteenth season. On 17 December 2016, it was reported that The Block producers and the owners of The Gatwick Hotel are currently in negotiations on purchasing the property. On 4 March 2017,  it was reported that the Gatwick Hotel deal did not go ahead and that the producers are searching for another property, however on 6 March 2017, it was reported the producers were in a closing deal to buy the property as residents of the building are to move out. On 17 March 2017, it was reported that The Gatwick Hotel would not be the location of The Blocks thirteenth season, although there was still interest in the building. On 22 March 2017, Nine officially confirmed that the building had been purchased and will be used for a future season of The Block.

In June 2017, The Block producers lodged renovation plans for The Gatwick Hotel with Port Phillip City Council. On 23 July 2017,  the renovation plans were officially released,  the information included that the network paid $10 million for the building (not $15 million as originally reported), it was confirmed that the site will have eight apartments, two-bedrooms on the ground level and three-bedrooms for the remaining homes, the existing roof to be partly demolished and a fourth floor built to include pergolas above outdoor terraces & a car park area would have six car spaces and bicycle parking, and each apartment would come with secure storage.

Applications for the fourteenth season of the series opened in August 2017 until 10 September 2017, looking for couples aged between 18 and 65 years old being sought by casting agents. Filming for the season was originally slated to occur between January 2018 and April 2018, but will begin filming on 8 February 2018. In October 2017, the fourteenth season and location of The Block were officially confirmed at Nine’s upfronts. In June 2018, Network Nine announced the teams for the fourteenth season of The Block. In July 2018, Network Nine announced the premiere date of Season 14 as Sunday, 5 August at 7pm.

This season is sponsored by Mitre 10 (building equipment), Domain (cash flow & house marketing), McCafé (snacks & beverages), Volkswagen (transport & cash flow), Youfoodz (groceries & meals) & BlueScope Steel (housing foundation, weekly viewer’s choice voting & promotion).

Hayden Vale & Sara Tumino won the season with $545,000 + $100,000 prize money. Each team of contestants won $209,000 or more. The auction profits had a combined result of $.

Season 15

In June 2018, it was reported that The Block producers had acquired a rundown backpackers accommodation, Oslo Hotel, at 38 Grey Street, St Kilda, through an off-market deal struck after the series approached one of the owners. The building contains five mansions hidden behind the facade. The series producers and building planners set to submit renovation plans to the City of Port Phillip council imminently. In October 2018, the Oslo Hotel was confirmed as the next location for renovation, Nine Network acquired the building for $10.8 million.

In July 2019, Network Nine announced the teams for the fifteenth season of The Block and announced the premiere date as Sunday, 4 August at 7pm.

This season is sponsored by Mitre 10 (building equipment), Domain (cash flow & house marketing), McCafé (snacks & beverages), Volkswagen (transport & cash flow), Lite N‘ Easy (groceries & meals) & BlueScope Steel (housing foundation, weekly viewer’s choice voting & promotion).

Tess Cattana & Luke Struber won the season with $630,000 + $100,000 prize money. Each team of contestants won $384,000 or more. The auction profits had a combined result of $.

 Season 16 

In July 2019, it was reported by the Herald Sun that The Block and Channel 9 had acquired a vacant block of land in the exclusive bayside suburb of Brighton on 360 New Street, Brighton. Newly renovated houses are expected to be built on the land in 2020 for the 16th season of the Block.

Applications for the sixteenth season of the series opened in August 2019 until 15 September 2019, looking for couples aged between 18 and 65 years old being sought by casting agents. Filming for the season is slated to begin in late January 2020.

In October 2019, the sixteenth season and location of The Block were officially confirmed at Nine’s upfronts.

In March 2020, the season was suspended due to the coronavirus pandemic and the potential risk it could cause to the crew, workers and contestants. After more than a month of suspension, the season resumed production on 4 May 2020 With extra safety precautions set in place.

In July 2020, Nine Network announced the teams for this season. The sixteenth season of The Block will premiere on Sunday, 23 August at 7pm.

This season is sponsored by Mitre 10 (building equipment), Domain (cash flow & house marketing), McCafé (snacks & beverages), Ford (transport & cash flow), Lite N‘ Easy (meals), Aldi (groceries) & BlueScope Steel (housing foundation, weekly viewer’s choice voting & promotion).

Jimmy & Tam Wilkins won the season with $966,000 + $100,000 prize money, which makes them the first team to win over $1 million. Each team of contestants won $460,000 or more. The auction profits had a combined result of $, which is currently the highest combined result over all seasons.

Season 17

Applications for the seventeenth season of the series opened in August 2020 until 27 September 2020, looking for couples aged between 18 and 65 years old being sought by casting agents. Filming is expected to be a 10–12 week shoot period from late February 2021 In September 2020, the seventeenth season of The Block was officially confirmed at Nine’s 2021 upfronts. In October 2020, it was reported that 5 properties on Bronte Court in Hampton, Victoria, were in the process of being purchased by Nine. In December 2020, it was confirmed that Bronte Court will be the next location for renovation, Nine Network acquired five houses in the area for $11.5 million combined.

In July 2021, it was officially confirmed the season will be Fans vs Faves, the second iteration of the format since season 8. Returning to the series are Mitch and Mark (season 15) / Ronnie and Georgia (season 13). Joining The Block will be Tanya and Vito, Josh and Luke & Kirsty and Jesse.

The seventeenth season of The Block premiered on Sunday, 8 August at 7pm.

Mitch Edwards & Mark McKie won the season with $644,444.44 + $100,000 prize money, Each team of contestants won $296,000 or more.
The auction profits had a combined result of $.

Season 18

Applications for the eighteenth season of the series opened in September 2021 until 18 October 2021, looking for couples aged between 18 and 65 years old being sought by casting agents. Filming is expected to be a 10–12 week shoot period from late February 2022. In September 2021, the eighteenth season of The Block was officially confirmed at Nine’s 2022 upfronts, and for the first time the series will be heading to a regional location, the Macedon Ranges, where the contestants will be transforming country houses.

In early April 2022, the day filming was scheduled to commence it was confirmed by sources that a contestant had tested positive to COVID-19. Filming was delayed by a week with filming commencing mid-April.

Omar & Oz won the season with $1,586,666.66 + $100,000 prize money, leaving both of them with $843,333 each and being the biggest profit to date for one team. Despite the huge win the other teams didn’t fare so well. Ryan & Rachel passed in at auction but immediately sold to the highest bidder for $169,000.50 and Tom & Sarah-Jane sold for $20,000.99 the lowest profit since season 9. Ankur & Sharon and Dylan & Jenny’s homes were both passed in with no result on auction day. On 11 November 2022, it was confirmed Ankur & Sharon‘s house had sold for $4.25 million giving them a profit of $170,000. On 13 February 2023, Dylan and Jenny’s house was sold for an undisclosed amount more than 3 months after auction.

Viewership
The two first seasons were successful with audience viewership, with the first season averaging 2.2 million viewers. Season 1 Finale was watched by 3.115 million viewers and Season 2 was watched by 2.273 million viewers.

The third season debuted with 1,134,000, a daily rank of 9. It lost to all its main time slot competition consisting of Glee on Network Ten and Border Security on the Seven Network. However, it remained successful with key demographics and enjoyed steady ratings throughout the season. Season 3 concluded with 1.712 million viewers, and was the top program of the night in total people and all key demographics. It was also the second most-watched program of the week.

Awards and nominations

Reno RumbleReno Rumble was a program that pit teams from The Block against teams from the Seven Network's reality series House Rules. The program aired on the Nine Network and was produced by the same production company as The Block.

The series was renewed for a second season but did not involve former contestants from The Block or House Rules and was only produced by the Nine Network.

Adaptations

Death
 
One of the workers, John Jeremy Bradley, passed away earlier in October 2022. He suffered a heart attack and he was 42.

Notes
The first season has retroactively been re-titled The Block 2003 as shown in The Block: All Stars when Phil and Amity were noted as having previously appeared in "The Block 2003".
The second season has retroactively been re-titled The Block 2004, in line with the re-titled first season.
Despite constant references to "The Blocktagon" being made by hosts, contestants and other media, the eleventh season was the first season since The Block 2 to not have the title appear on-screen. The title sequence only said "The Block".
Although this is the second time the title Fans vs Faves will be used, this is actually the third season to have returning contestants versus new contestants (seasons 8 & 10 respectively).
Season 8 was the first time the series was titled Fans vs Faves.

See also

 List of Australian television series
 List of programs broadcast by Nine Network
 House Rules (Australian TV series)
 The Renovators

References

External links
 Official website
 

 
2000s Australian reality television series
Nine Network original programming
2003 Australian television series debuts
2004 Australian television series endings
2010 Australian television series debuts
Television shows set in Sydney
Television shows set in Melbourne
Home renovation television series
Australian television series revived after cancellation
English-language television shows
2010s Australian reality television series
2020s Australian reality television series